Jack Levi Sutton (born 24 March 1997) is an English professional footballer who plays as a defender or midfielder for Harrogate Town

Club career
Sutton came through the ranks at Bottesford Town and Scunthorpe United, he signed his first pro contract with Scunthorpe on 2 June 2015. Although, his first three involvements with the Scunthorpe first-team matchday squad came during September 2014 when he was an unused substitute in games against Chesterfield, Coventry City and Leyton Orient. Sutton made his Scunthorpe league debut on 28 March 2016 in a 6–0 home victory over Swindon Town. After four further appearances in all competitions for Scunthorpe, Sutton departed in November to join National League side North Ferriby United on loan for a month.

He made his debut on 26 November in a loss to Solihull Moors. After five appearances in all competitions for North Ferriby, Sutton extended his loan with the club on 30 December 2016 until the end of the 2016–17 season. However, Scunthorpe recalled Sutton on 9 January 2017. He signed a new two-year contract with Scunthorpe in September 2017. After breaking into Scunthorpe's first-team, Sutton transitioned from a central midfielder to a right-back. On 31 August 2018, Sutton was loaned to National League outfit Harrogate Town for three months. He was recalled a month later. Sutton scored his first senior goal on 5 January 2019 versus Coventry City.

His contract was extended by twelve months by Scunthorpe at the end of the 2018–19 season. On 11 July 2020, Sutton joined EFL League Two side Bradford City on a free transfer. His first appearance came in an EFL Trophy penalty shoot-out defeat to Doncaster Rovers on 8 September, while his league debut came on 26 September against Stevenage; he was unable to make his League Two bow earlier due to a suspension that carried over from his time with Scunthorpe.

He was one of seven players offered a new contract by Bradford City at the end of the 2021–22 season.

International career
Internationally, Sutton was approached by the FAW at a young age to play for Wales.

Personal life
Sutton was born at Scunthorpe General Hospital in 1996. He has three sisters and four brothers, his great grandfather is Italian. Sutton visited Gunness School nursery, prior to attending Messingham Primary School and Frederick Gough Secondary School. He supports Manchester United, but his favourite footballer growing up was Zinedine Zidane.

Career statistics
.

References

External links

1997 births
Living people
Sportspeople from Scunthorpe
English footballers
Association football midfielders
English Football League players
Scunthorpe United F.C. players
North Ferriby United A.F.C. players
Harrogate Town A.F.C. players
Bradford City A.F.C. players